Geoffrey Robinson (December 1934 – 15 December 2011) was an English rugby union, and professional rugby league footballer who played in the 1950s and 1960s.

Background
Geoffrey Robinson's birth was registered in Wigton district, Cumberland, England, and he died aged 77.

Playing career

County honours
Geoff Robinson represented Cumberland & Westmorland (RU) while at Workington RFC, and represented Cumberland (RL) while at Whitehaven.

County Cup Final appearances
Geoff Robinson played left-, i.e. number 11, in Warrington's 16-5 victory over Rochdale Hornets in the 1965 Lancashire County Cup Final during the 1965–66 season at Knowsley Road, St. Helens on Friday 29 October 1965.

Notable tour matches
Geoff Robinson played  in Whitehaven's 14-11 victory over Australia in the 1956–57 Kangaroo tour of Great Britain and France match at the Recreation Ground, Whitehaven on Saturday 20 October 1956, in front of a crowd of 10,917.

Club career
Geoff Robinson played  in Whitehaven's defeat by Leeds in the 1957 Challenge Cup semi-final during the 1956–57 season at Odsal Stadium, Bradford, he was transferred from Whitehaven to Oldham in 1959 for £9,000 (based on increases in average earnings, this would be approximately £532,700 in 2014).

Honoured at Whitehaven
Geoff Robinson is a Whitehaven Hall of Fame Inductee.

References

External links
Search for "Robinson" at rugbyleagueproject.org
Statistics at orl-heritagetrust.org.uk
(archived by web.archive.org) Big Geoff was star of No 13 shirt
(archived by web.archive.org) Rugby legend Geoff Robinson dies at 77
Billy relives Wembley heartbreak
Statistics at wolvesplayers.thisiswarrington.co.uk

1934 births
2011 deaths
Cumberland rugby league team players
English rugby league players
English rugby union players
Oldham R.L.F.C. players
Rugby league locks
Rugby league players from Wigton
Rugby union players from Wigton
Warrington Wolves players
Whitehaven R.L.F.C. players